Agersborg is a Norwegian surname. Notable people with the surname include:

Henrik Agersborg (1872–1942), Norwegian sailor
Knut Andreas Pettersen Agersborg (1765–1847), Norwegian politician

Norwegian-language surnames